Patrick Gomdaogo Ilboudo (February 18, 1951- February 28, 1994) was a writer from in Ouagadougou, Burkina Faso.

He was born in Bilbalgo neighborhood. He went to a school in Baoghin and Laurent Gilhat high school and after his BEPC, he had to start working.

He studied modern literature at the University of Ouagadougou with a master in IFP and a doctorate at the Panthéon-Assas University in 1983 with  La politique française vue par les journaux africains

In 1980, he founded the mutual insurance company for the union and solidarity of writers (MUSE) with writers like Norbert Zongo.

Ilboudo was an assistant in institut africain d'études cinématographiques (INAFEC) of the University of Ouagadougou. In 1983 he created the associative anti-racist humanitarian movement MOVRAP.

Works 
 Les Toilettes , 1983
 Le Procès du Muet, 1986
 Le Vertige du trône, 1990
 Le Héraut têtu, 1992

Awards
Grand prix littéraire d'Afrique noire, 1992.

References 

1951 births
1994 deaths
Burkinabé male writers
People from Ouagadougou